Michael Magner VC (21 June 1840 – 6 February 1897) was born in County Fermanagh, Ireland and was an Irish recipient of the Victoria Cross, the highest and most prestigious award for gallantry in the face of the enemy that can be awarded to British and Commonwealth forces.

Details
He was 27 years old, and a drummer in the 33rd Regiment of Foot, later the Duke of Wellington's Regiment, British Army, during the Abyssinia Expedition when the following deed took place for which he was awarded the VC.

On 13 April 1868 in Abyssinia (now Ethiopia), during the assault on Magdala, when the head of the column of attack was checked by the obstacles at the gate, a small stream of officers and men of the 33rd Regiment and an officer of the Royal Engineers broke away from the main approach to Magdala and, reaching the defences, climbed a cliff, forced their way over a wall and through a strong and thorny fence, thus turning the defenders of the gateway. The first two men to enter Magdala were Drummer Magner and a private (James Bergin).

Magner later achieved the rank of Corporal. He died in Melbourne, Australia on 6 February 1897.

The medal
Magner's medal is on public display in Museum Victoria, Carlton Gardens, Melbourne, Australia.

References

Listed in order of publication year 
The Register of the Victoria Cross (1981, 1988 and 1997)

Ireland's VCs  (Dept of Economic Development, 1995)
Monuments to Courage (David Harvey, 1999)
Irish Winners of the Victoria Cross (Richard Doherty & David Truesdale, 2000)

External links

1840 births
1897 deaths
19th-century Irish people
Irish soldiers in the British Army
British military personnel of the Abyssinian War
Irish recipients of the Victoria Cross
Duke of Wellington's Regiment soldiers
Military personnel from County Fermanagh
Irish emigrants to colonial Australia
British military musicians
British Army recipients of the Victoria Cross